Atawallpa Much'u (Aymara atawallpa hen, much'u little child, "hen's little child", Hispanicized spelling Atahualpa Mocho) is a mountain in the Andes of Peru, about  high. It is located in the Cusco Region, Espinar Province, on the border of the districts of Condoroma and Ocoruro. Atawallpa Much'u lies northwest of Atawallpa.

References

Mountains of Peru
Mountains of Cusco Region